In enzymology, a N-acetylhexosamine 1-dehydrogenase is an enzyme that catalyzes the chemical reaction

N-acetyl-D-glucosamine + NAD+  N-acetyl-D-glucosaminate + NADH + H+

Thus, the two substrates of this enzyme are N-acetyl-D-glucosamine and NAD+, whereas its 3 products are N-acetyl-D-glucosaminate, NADH, and H+.

This enzyme belongs to the family of oxidoreductases, specifically those acting on the CH-OH group of donor with NAD+ or NADP+ as acceptor. The systematic name of this enzyme class is N-acetyl-D-hexosamine:NAD+ 1-oxidoreductase. Other names in common use include N-acetylhexosamine dehydrogenase, and N-acetyl-D-hexosamine dehydrogenase.

References

 

EC 1.1.1
NADH-dependent enzymes
Enzymes of unknown structure